Air Defence Brigade is a brigade of the Namibian Army based at Windhoek. It functions as the Army's Air Defence Formation and hosts all the Air Defence regiments of the Army. It was founded in 1991 as the Air Defence Battalion, later it was changed into the Air defence regiment before being upgraded into a brigade.

Equipment

The Brigade uses the following equipment:
37 mm automatic air defense gun M1939 (61-K)
ZU-23-2
9K32 Strela-2
FN-6

Units
 12 Air Defence Regiment
 21 Air Defence Regiment
 26 Air Defence Regiment

Leadership

References

Military of Namibia
Air defence brigades